Lanzhousaurus (meaning "Lanzhou lizard") is a genus of ornithopod dinosaur. Lanzhousaurus lived in the Gansu region of what is now China during the Early Cretaceous (Barremian). A partial skeleton has been recovered from the Hekou Group. It was described by You, Ji and Li in 2005 and the type and only species is Lanzhousaurus magnidens. It's been estimated to be about 10 meters (33 feet) in length and 6 tonnes (6.6 short tons) in weight.

Dentition 
The genus has been described as having "astonishingly huge teeth", among the largest for any herbivorous creature ever, which indicate it was a styracosternan iguanodont. The mandible, longer than one meter, suggests a very large size for the animal. Tooth enamel of this dinosaur was growing very rapidly.

References

Early Cretaceous dinosaurs of Asia
Fossil taxa described in 2005
Iguanodonts
Paleontology in Gansu
Ornithischian genera